The 2020 United States Senate election in Alaska was held on November 3, 2020, to elect a member of the United States Senate to represent the State of Alaska, concurrently with the nationwide presidential election, as well as other elections to the United States Senate, elections to the United States House of Representatives and various state and local elections. Incumbent Republican Senator Dan Sullivan won re-election to a second term in office, defeating Democratic nominee Al Gross, the son of Avrum Gross, who ran as an independent candidate. John Wayne Howe, the nominee of the Alaskan Independence Party, was also on the ballot and finished a distant third.

Both primaries took place on August 18, 2020. Some pundits considered this to be a potential "dark horse" flip for the Democrats, as Gross did unexpectedly well in polling despite Alaska usually being considered a Republican stronghold, even leading in some polls. However, this lead did not materialize. Sullivan won re-election by a margin of 12.7%, triple his average lead in the pre-election polling. Sullivan also became the first candidate since 2002 to win a Senate election in Alaska with more than 50% of the vote.

Republican primary

Candidates

Nominee
 Dan Sullivan, incumbent U.S. Senator

Withdrawn
 Adam Master Newman

Endorsements

Primary results

Libertarian–Democratic–Independence primary
Candidates from the Alaska Democratic Party, the Alaska Libertarian Party, and the Alaskan Independence Party appear on the same ballot, with the highest-placed candidate from each party receiving that party's nomination. In October 2017, the Alaska Democratic Party sued for the right to allow non-Democrats to compete for and win the Democratic nomination, which was ultimately decided in their favor in April 2018.

Democratic candidates

Nominee
Al Gross (Independent), orthopedic surgeon, commercial fisherman, and son of former Alaska Attorney General Avrum Gross

Eliminated in primary
Edgar Blatchford (Democratic), Democratic candidate in the 2016 election for the U.S. Senate, founder and former editor and publisher of Alaska Newspapers, Inc., former Mayor of Seward (1999–2003) and former commissioner of the Alaska Department of Commerce, Community and Economic Development
Chris Cumings (Independent), Democratic candidate in the 2018 election for Alaska's at-large congressional district and ex-bank employee

Disqualified from the ballot
Larry N. Barnes (Independent)

Withdrawn
David Darden (Independent), nonpartisan candidate for Anchorage Assembly District 3 Seat E in the 2018 special election

Alaskan Independence candidates

Nominee
John Howe (Alaskan Independence), machinist

Endorsements

Primary results

Other candidates

Green Party

Nominee
Jed Whittaker, Green nominee in the 1996 United States Senate election in Alaska and salvage company owner (write-in candidate)

Independent

Declared
Sidney "Sid" Hill, Independent write-in candidate for the 2018 election in Alaska's at-large congressional district, Independent write-in candidate for the 2014 United States Senate election in Alaska and LaRouchite (write-in candidate)
Karen Nanouk (write-in candidate)

Withdrawn
David Matheny, wildfire technician

General election

Predictions

Endorsements

Polls
Graphical summary

Polling

with Forrest Dunbar

with Forrest Dunbar as an independent

Results

Notes

Partisan clients

References

Further reading

External links
 
 
  (State affiliate of the U.S. League of Women Voters)
 

Official campaign websites
 Al Gross (I) for Senate
 John Howe (AI) for Senate
 Dan Sullivan (R) for Senate

2020
Alaska
United States Senate